The Poland women's national rugby sevens team represents Poland in rugby sevens. They compete in the Rugby Europe Women's Sevens. Poland placed second overall at the 2021 Rugby Europe Women's Sevens Championship Series. They helped Kazakhstan prepare for the Olympic qualifiers.

Poland qualified for the 2022 Rugby World Cup Sevens in Cape Town after winning one of four available spots at the European Qualifiers in Bucharest.

Tournament history

Rugby World Cup Sevens

Players

Recent squad

Previous squads

References 

Women's national rugby sevens teams
Rugby union in Poland
Women's national sports teams of Poland